Rustam Arslanovich Khalimbekov (born 11 July 1996) is a Russian football player. He plays for FC Dynamo Makhachkala.

Club career
He made his debut in the Russian Professional Football League for FC Legion Dynamo Makhachkala on 29 August 2016 in a game against FC Krasnodar-2.

He made his debut for the main squad of FC Anzhi Makhachkala on 20 September 2017 in a Russian Cup game against FC Luch-Energiya Vladivostok.

Personal life
His father Arslan Khalimbekov is a football coach and a former player.

References

External links
 Profile by Russian Professional Football League

1996 births
Footballers from Makhachkala
Living people
Russian footballers
Association football defenders
Association football midfielders
FC Anzhi Makhachkala players
FC Angusht Nazran players
FC Dynamo Makhachkala players
Russian First League players
Russian Second League players